Matthew Cody Carlson (born November 5, 1963) is a former professional American football player who was selected by the Houston Oilers in the 3rd round of the 1987 NFL Draft. A 6'3", 200-lb. quarterback from Baylor University, Carlson played in seven NFL seasons and his entire career with the Oilers from 1987 to 1994. His nickname while with the Oilers was Commander Cody.

NFL career
Carlson began his career with the Houston Oilers as a backup to Warren Moon, and his most productive season was during the 1992 season due to Moon getting injured. He passed for 1,710 yards in 11 games (6 starts). Overall, he posted a 10–4 record as a starter during his years as Moon's backup. Moon departed after the 1993 season with Carlson named as his starting replacement. However, he lasted only five games into the 1994 season, posting a 1–4 record and 44.7 completion percentage before he suffered an injury and missed the remainder of the year. The Oilers ended the season with a franchise-worst 2-14 record.  The coaching change in the middle of the 1994 season signaled a new direction for the Oilers, and, with Carlson coming off his injury, the team opted to let him go. He retired after the 1994 NFL season.

He now lives in Austin, Texas.

References

1963 births
Living people
People from Dallas
American football quarterbacks
Baylor Bears football players
Houston Oilers players